Kill Chain: Drones and the Rise of High-Tech Assassins is a 2015 non-fiction book written by Andrew Cockburn.

Synopsis
The book explores the use of drone warfare by the United States government. Cockburn investigates the origins of US drone warfare and the command centre in Nevada.

Reception
In The Washington Post Karen J. Greenberg was receptive to the book while in The Scotsman Tim Cornwell described the book as "well-reasoned and sometimes dense critique of drone warfare" which turns "into finely honed outrage".
The book was also reviewed in The Irish Times.

References

2015 non-fiction books
Books about foreign relations of the United States
War on Terror books
War in Afghanistan (2001–2021) books
Verso Books books